Emily Barker (born 13 December 1996) is a British dancer and choreographer. She is a professional dancer on the Irish version of Dancing with the Stars.

Career 
In 2016, Barker toured with the Burn the Floor tour.

In 2017 and 2018, she performed alongside Strictly Come Dancing professional Giovanni Pernice in his UK & Ireland tours.

In 2017 and 2018, she also toured with Strictly Come Dancing contestants Harry Judd and Louis Smith, along with Aston Merrygold's UK tour, Rip it Up.

Dancing with the Stars 
In 2017, Barker was announced as one of the professional dancers for the first series of Dancing with the Stars. She was partnered with Big Brother UK runner-up, Hughie Maughan. They were the first couple eliminated from the competition.

In 2018, Barker was partnered with Olympic medal-winning race walker, Rob Heffernan. They reached the quarterfinals of the competition, eventually finishing in fifth place.

In 2019, Barker was partnered with actor, Johnny Ward. They reached the final of the competition, eventually finishing as joint runners-up to Mairéad Ronan and John Nolan.

In 2020, Barker partnered, former Kilkenny hurler, Aidan Fogarty. They reached the final, finishing joint runners-up to Lottie Ryan and Pasquale La Rocca. This was Barker’s second time in a row to reach the final, making her the second professional dancer to do this.

In 2022, Barker partnered former RTÉ newsreader, Aengus Mac Grianna. They reached the fifth week of the competition, finishing in 10th place. On 10 March, it was announced that Barker would partner Jordan Conroy for week 10 when his regular professional partner, Salome Chachua, tested positive for COVID-19.

In 2023, Barker partnered RTÉ 2fm Breakfast presenter, Carl Mullan. They reached the final and won the competition, making this Barker's first win since she joined the show in 2017. Barker also became the first professional dancer to make three non-consecutive finals.

Highest and Lowest Scoring Per Dance

1 These scores was awarded during Switch-Up Week.

Series 1 

 Celebrity partner
 Hughie Maughan; Average: 16; Place: 11th

Series 2 

 Celebrity partner
 Rob Heffernan; Average: 20.9; Place: 5th

Series 3 

 Celebrity partner
 Johnny Ward; Average: 25.9; Place: 2nd

Series 4 

 Celebrity partner
 Aidan Fogarty; Average: 23.2; Place: 2nd

Series 5 

 Celebrity partner
 Aengus Mac Grianna; Average: 13.7; Place: 10th

Series 6 

 Celebrity partner
 Carl Mullan; Average: 23.7; Place: 1st

Personal life 
From 2016 Barker was in a relationship with fellow Dancing with the Stars professional dancer, Curtis Pritchard. In early 2019 it was reported the couple were no longer an item. In late 2019, Barker and her Series 3 celebrity dance partner, Johnny Ward, confirmed they were an item. They ended their relationship in March 2020.

References 

1996 births
Living people
British ballroom dancers